Happy Hour is an album by Ted Hawkins. It was released in 1986.

Critical reception
AllMusic wrote that "Hawkins blended soul and urban blues stylings with country and rural blues inflections and rhythms, making another first-rate release." Trouser Press praised Hawkins's "sturdy emotional delivery."

Track listing
All tracks composed by Theodore Hawkins, Jnr.; except where indicated
 "Bad Dog"
 "Happy Hour" (Dave Mackechnie, Steve Gillette)
 "Don't Make Me Explain It"
 "The Constitution"
 "My Last Goodbye"
 "You Pushed My Head Away"
 "Revenge of Scorpio"
 "California Song"
 "Cold & Bitter Tears"
 "Gypsy Woman" (Curtis Mayfield)
 "Ain't That Pretty"
 "One Hundred Miles"

Personnel
Ted Hawkins – vocals, guitar
Dale Wilson – lead guitar
Augie Brown – guitar
Dennis Walker – bass
Johnny Greer – drums
Elizabeth Hawkins – vocals
Robert Cray as "Night Train Clemons" – guitar on "You Pushed My Head Away" and "Gypsy Woman"

References 

1985 albums
Ted Hawkins albums
Rounder Records albums